The Greater America Exposition was a world's fair held on North Omaha, Nebraska from July 1 to October 31, 1899.

Formation
After the 1898 Trans-Mississippi Exposition exhibition a group of investors decided to retain some of the buildings and hold a second season at Kountze Park in 1899 with a new theme. President McKinley expressed support for the exhibition as an opportunity to show America's new colonial possessions following the Spanish–American War.

Grounds
The grounds were refurbished with 500 staff patching and painting buildings and replanting flower beds. And the concrete walkways were replaced by red brick ones.

Buildings
There were
agriculture, 
apiary,
colonial exhibits,
dairy, 
fine arts and liberal arts, 
horticulture, 
international, 
manufactures,
and 
mines and mining, 
buildings,
a machinery hall, 
a 520 by 150 feet United States pavilion,
and auxiliary buildings including press, fire, police and a hospital.

New possessions

One March 18, 1899 the government agreed to transport agents to fetch exhibits from  
Cuba, 
Hawaii, 
the Philippines
and 
Porto Rico.

60 tubs of Hawaiian plants were destroyed when customs officials dumped the Hawaiian shipment, and a second Hawaiian shipment went missing between San Francisco and Omaha. After the exhibition some of the Hawaiian exhibits were sent to a forthcoming Paris exhibition.

The Cuban village included over 700 snakes, a garrotte and the hangman Valentine Ruiz.

The Philippines had planned to include monkeys, native birds and four water buffaloes. Six water buffaloes were shipped though only two water buffaloes arrived in Omaha.

See also
 Treaty of Paris (1898) for the Treaty that led to the new possessions which McKinley wanted to show.

References

External links
 "Trans-Mississippi Exposition" by UNL and the University of Omaha has many images of the buildings at the fair.
 "A History of the 1899 Greater America Exposition" by Adam Fletcher Sasse for NorthOmahaHistory.com

1899 in Nebraska
Festivals established in 1898
History of North Omaha, Nebraska
World's fairs in the United States
Aftermath of the Spanish–American War in the United States
Colonial exhibitions
Trans-Mississippi Exposition